The National Electoral Commission (NEC) is the national election commission of Somaliland.The commission organizes Somaliland's presidential elections, parliamentary elections, local council elections and referendums. The current Chairman of the commission is Abdirashid Mohamoud Ali.

Members
The commission consists seven members; three of them are nominated by the President of Somaliland, two are nominated by the House of Elders, and the remaining two are nominated by the opposition parties.
The nominees are then approved by the House of Representatives, the office term of the commission is five years.

References

External links
Somaliland Electoral Law Resources

2002 establishments in Somaliland
Elections in Somaliland
Somaliland
Government agencies of Somaliland